Onoba leptalea is a species of minute sea snail, a marine gastropod mollusk or micromollusk in the family Rissoidae.

Distribution

Onoba leptalea

Description 
The maximum recorded shell length is 3 mm.

Habitat 
Minimum recorded depth is 50 m. Maximum recorded depth is 1836 m.

References

External links

Rissoidae
Gastropods described in 1884